Florence Regional Airport  is three miles east of Florence, in Florence County, South Carolina.

The only scheduled flights are American Eagle to Charlotte-Douglas International Airport, about 30 minutes.

Facilities

As of 31 January 2020, the airport had 18,447 aircraft operations, average 51 per day: 79% general aviation, 14% air taxi and 7% military. 44 aircraft were then based at the airport: 59% single-engine, 31% multi-engine, 5% jet, and 5% helicopters.

Airline and destination

Destination statistics

History
During World War II the United States Army Air Forces' Third Air Force used the airport as a training base and added . Known as Florence Army Airfield, the 52d Pursuit Group was assigned to the airfield on 18 February 1942 and trained with P-39 Airacobra and P-40 Warhawks until departing on 27 April for Wilmington, North Carolina.

A succession of Troop Carrier groups trained at Florence during 1943 those being the 63d, 65th, 313th and 315th prior to their deployment to Europe and North Africa. The airfield became a combat crew replacement training school for A-20 Havoc light bomber crews, with the 411th Bombardment Group being the Operational Training Unit at Florence AAF from 15 August 1943 until 1 May 1944.

After the 344th was inactivated, replacement training was taken over by the 334th Army Air Forces Base Unit (Replacement Training Unit, Light Bombardment).  Support units at Florence AAF were the 407th Base Headquarters and Air Base Squadron; 10th Aviation Squadron; 958th Guard Squadron; 341st Sub-Depot; HQ, 411th Bombardment Group (Light).

Florence AAF controlled two auxiliary training bases for its A-20 training.

 Hartsville AAF Darlington, South Carolina  
 Hartsville Auxiliary Field, Hartsville, South Carolina  

In early 1945 the airfield was transferred to First Air Force and the 127th Army Air Forces Base unit (Combat Crew Training Station, Light) assumed the A-26 Invader training mission.

The property was given back to the City of Florence on 31 October 1945 and later shared with Florence County.

Eastern Airlines served FLO from 1948 to 1965; Piedmont Airlines flights (including Boeing 737s) ended in 1981.

Operation of the airport was assigned to the Pee Dee Regional Airport Authority in 1999. The authority had nine representatives from the Pee Dee Regional Airport District, which includes the City of Florence, and the counties of Florence, Dillon and Marion.

Florence Air & Missile Museum
From the 1960s until 1997 Florence was home to a large aviation museum, the Florence Air & Missile Museum.  When it closed, the collection was divided among other museums in the United States.

See also

 South Carolina World War II Army Airfields

References

External links
 Florence Regional Airport, official site
 
 
 

Airports established in 1928
Airfields of the United States Army Air Forces in South Carolina
Airports in South Carolina
Buildings and structures in Florence County, South Carolina
Transportation in Florence County, South Carolina
1928 establishments in South Carolina